Telemundo is an American television network owned by NBCUniversal and the first telenovela was created in 1988. Through the years Telemundo has been associated with several foreign chains such as Caracol Televisión some of their telenovelas higher production have been Corazón Valiente produced in 2012, the first soap opera that won the Premios Tu Mundo, was Mi Corazón Insiste en Lola Volcán.

The following is a chronological list of telenovelas and television series produced by Telemundo:

1988–99

2000s

2010s

2020s

Notes

References 

 
Telemundo
Telenovelas